The Toshiko Akiyoshi Jazz Orchestra: Strive for Jive is a live video recording of the Toshiko Akiyoshi Jazz Orchestra featuring Lew Tabackin in a jazz club setting.   The video was apparently recorded in the mid 1980s in Chicago and first released on VHS video tape around 1993 and on DVD in 2009.

Track listing
All songs composed and orchestrated by Toshiko Akiyoshi:
 "Yellow Is Mellow"
 "Strive For Jive"
 "Quadrille, Anyone?"
 "Autumn Sea"
 "Warning: Success May Be Hazardous To Your Health"
 "Strive For Jive" (Reprise)

Personnel
Toshiko Akiyoshi – piano
Lew Tabackin – tenor saxophone, flute, piccolo
Walt Weiskopf – tenor saxophone, soprano saxophone, clarinet, flute
Frank Wess – alto saxophone, clarinet, flute
Jim Snidero – alto saxophone, soprano saxophone, flute
Ed Xiques – baritone saxophone, soprano saxophone, flute
Brian Lynch – trumpet
Joe Mosello – trumpet
John Eckert – trumpet
Chris Pasin – trumpet
Dave Panichi – trombone
Hart Smith – trombone
Bruce Otter – trombone
Matt Finders – bass trombone
Dennis Irwin – bass
Jeff Hirschfield – drums

References
V.I.E.W. Video 1336 (cover / credits)
Yanow, Scott. Allmusic [ (link)]  Accessed 30 July 2007.

External links
Rotten Tomatoes
Promotional video clip posted by publisher link

Concert films
Toshiko Akiyoshi Jazz Orchestra video albums
1993 video albums